Alice Dixson (born Jessie Alice Dixson; ; July 28, 1969) or often misspelled Alice Dixon, is an American–born Filipino actress, commercial model, and former beauty queen.

Biography
Born to an American father and a Filipino mother, she was the Philippines' representative for Miss International in 1986 and became a household name in 1987 through a Palmolive soap TV commercial where she sang the phrase "I can feel it!". After joining a talent contest in Eat Bulaga! and Binibining Pilipinas, her show business career started with the role of Faye, a fairy princess, who fell in love with an earthling in Okay Ka, Fairy Ko!. At that time, Eat Bulaga! was airing on RPN and one of its hosts, Vic Sotto, requested her to be part of the TV series (he is the owner of M-Zet Productions that produced Okay Ka, Fairy Ko!).

In January 2011, she returned to show business via Babaeng Hampaslupa which aired on TV5. This was succeeded with Glamorosa, Isang Dakot na Luha (2012), Enchanted Garden (2012) and two movies Ang Panday 2 (2011) and Just One Summer (2012). Her next TV series is Never Say Goodbye which airs in January 2013 on TV5.

Dixson is a licensed realtor in the Province of British Columbia, Canada and also a licensed real estate agent in Florida.

Dixson is also known for her best actress roles in many Viva Films favorites such as Hanggang Saan, Hanggang Kailan (1993), Sa Isang Sulok ng Pangarap (1994, based on the popular comics series by RJ Nuevas), Pangako ng Kahapon (1994), Sana Dalawa ang Puso Ko (1995) and the all-star cast of the action film Silakbo (1995) with Cesar Montano, Anjanette Abayari and Marjorie Barretto. Dixson is also a film favorite when she was paired with Christopher de Leon in films like My Husband's Woman (1993), Bakit Ngayon Ka Lang (1994, OctoArts Films) and Pahiram Kahit Sandali (1999, Regal Films), which was an R-rated but critically acclaimed film because of both leading woman's portrayals by Dixson and Ara Mina, earning credit for director Maryo J. de los Reyes. She reunited with de Leon and leading man Richard Gomez in the hit telenovela Ang Iibigin ay Ikaw and its sequel, Ang Iibigin ay Ikaw Pa Rin.

In December 2013, she posed for FHM Philippines, making her the oldest woman to appear on the cover of that men's magazine, at age 44.

In 2015, she returned to GMA Network after her contract with TV5 expired to star in the remake of the hit 1994 telenovela, MariMar.

In 2017, she transferred back to her home network, ABS-CBN, and did Ang Probinsyano. In 2018, she played Stella Cortez, the series’ main villain who caused the death of  Rodrigo and Rebecca in Ngayon at Kailanman.

In 2019, she returned to GMA Network through Madrasta and Beautiful Justice.

Filmography

Film

Television

Awards, nominations, and achievements
 2020 18th Gawad Tanglaw Film Acting Award for the movie "Nuuk" (winner)
2019 PMPC Star Awards for Television Best Supporting Actress nominee for "Ngayon at Kailanman" (nominee)
2018 2nd Eddys Awards Best Supporting Actress Nominee for the movie "The Ghost Bride" (nominee)
 2018 34th Star Awards for Movies Best Supporting Actress Nominee for the movie "The Ghost Bride" (nominee)
 2015 PEP Awards Female Star of the Night (winner)
 2014 People Asia Woman of Substance and Style Awardee (winner)
 2014 16th Gawad Pasado Awards PinakaPasadong Aktres (Best Actress) for the movie When the Love is Gone (winner)
 1998 Metro Manila Film Festival Best Actress for the movie Sambahin Ang Ngalan Mo (winner)
 1997 Metro Manila Film Festival Best Actress Nominee for the movie To Saudi With Love (nominee)
 1987 Philippine Movie Press Club Award for Most Promising Star (winner)
 Creative Guild of Accredited Advertising Agencies Award of Recognition as Commercial Model Discovery of 1987 (winner)
 1986 Semi-Finalists in the Miss International Pageant held in Nagasaki, Japan (semi-finalist)
 1986 Binibining Pilipinas International (winner)

Notes

References

External links
 Official website
 

1969 births
Living people
ABS-CBN personalities
American actresses of Filipino descent
American real estate brokers
Binibining Pilipinas winners
Filipino female models
Female models from Florida
Filipino film actresses
Filipino people of American descent
Filipino television actresses
GMA Network personalities
Miss International 1986 delegates
People from Coral Gables, Florida
TV5 (Philippine TV network) personalities
20th-century American actresses
21st-century American actresses